La Candelaria is a department located in Salta Province, Argentina.

With an area of  it borders to the north and east with Bolivia , to the east with Rosario de la Frontera Department, to the west with Guachipas Department, and to the south with  Tucumán Province.

Towns and municipalities
 El Jardín 
 El Tala
 La Candelaria

References

External links 
 Departments of Salta Province website

Departments of Salta Province